"Lovefool" is a song written by Peter Svensson and Nina Persson for Swedish rock band the Cardigans' third studio album, First Band on the Moon (1996). It was released as the album's lead single in Sweden in mid-1996 and on 9 September 1996 in the United Kingdom. In the United States, the song was serviced to radio in August 1996. A few months after its release, the track was included in the Baz Luhrmann film Romeo + Juliet, helping the song gain international recognition.

"Lovefool" peaked at number two on the UK Singles Chart following a re-release in 1997 and achieved moderate success on other European charts. In North America, it reached number three in Canada and number two on the US Billboard Hot 100 Airplay Chart (it did not appear on the Hot 100 due to rules in place at the time). In Australasia, the song topped the New Zealand Singles Chart and climbed to number 11 in Australia, earning gold sales certifications in both regions.

Background
Persson wrote the lyrics to the song at an airport while waiting for a plane. She later said that the song is "quite a sad love song; the meaning of it is quite pathetic, really." She also added that "the biggest hits are the ones that are the easiest to write".

She said that, at the time, the song "was slower and more of a bossa nova". Persson noted that the band knew the potential commercial appeal of the song, saying, "We definitely were aware that it was a single and a catchy song when we wrote it, but the direction it took is not something we could have predicted. It wasn't necessarily our character; it felt like a bit of a freak on the record — which, objectively, it still is.  But then when we were recording, by chance, our drummer started to play that kind of disco beat, and there was no way to get away from it after that".

Music and structure
"Lovefool" is a song that is performed in several keys and modulates based on chorus and verse. The chorus is in the key of A major using a I–IV–ii–V chord progression. The verses use a i–iv–VII–III chord progression in A minor. It is written in common time and moves at 112 beats per minute. The song's middle 8 is four bars long.

Release
The song was initially a hit in several European countries, reaching number 15 on the Swedish Singles Chart and peaking at number 21 on the UK Singles Chart during its first release in 1996. Following its appearance in Romeo + Juliet, the song gained international attention, eventually reaching a new peak of number two on the UK Singles Chart following a re-release in April 1997. It then achieved international success, becoming a number-one hit in New Zealand and peaking just outside the top 10 in Australia at number 11. "Lovefool" became a crossover hit in the US after peaking at number nine on the Billboard Modern Rock Tracks chart, reaching number two on the Hot 100 Airplay chart. It reached number one on the Top 40 Mainstream chart and number two on the Adult Top 40, staying there for eight nonconsecutive weeks. The single was not eligible to chart on the Hot 100 at the time since singles not made commercially available in the US were ineligible to chart.

In Persson's words, the immense commercial success of "Lovefool" "freaked [her] out". She explained, "We were kind of snobs. We felt like these things were glitzy, and we felt like, 'No, no, we're a rock band!'"

Critical reception
Tom Moon from Knight-Ridder Newspapers noted that the "mercilessly catchy" song "has become a rallying cry for jilted lovers everywhere." Sara Scribner from Los Angeles Times opined that Persson "begs for lies" on a "almost criminally catchy" tune. Bryan Lark from The Michigan Daily called it a "sugary sing-along". Thanos Lolis from Miscellany News said it is "three minutes of sparkly, ABBAesque disco, very danceable and very capable of making a global hit." He also described it as "catchy kitsch-in-sync". Pan-European magazine Music & Media stated that it's a "trademark Cardigans track", adding that "this energetic mid-tempo single suggests summertime follies and lazy craziness. The cheerful chorus hints at old time disco." A reviewer from Music Week rated it four out of five, commenting, "Prepare for world domination by these Swedish popsters, whose first single (...) takes their candy pop style and injects it with a distinct Seventies disco feel." Editor Alan Jones added, "It's a quaint and quirky pop nugget with a smooth, caressing vocal and a sublime hook. It seems certain to earn the group their biggest hit yet." Mark Sutherland from NME described it as "dizzy disco". A reviewer from People magazine labeled it as "boppy". Jason Cohen from Rolling Stone noted that Persson's "airy lack of affectation actually deepens her dark, romantic sentiments when she chirps cheerily about her status as a willingly deceived doormat". Charles Aaron from Spin called it "lounge music so chilly with irony that you better bring a sweater, binky." Nick Mirov from The Stanford Daily noted that Persson is "sounding self-assured and confident" when she is "getting her own heart broken". Jaime Holguin from Star-News viewed it as a "kitschy pop gem" and "sticky sweet". Ian Hyland from Sunday Mirror stated that it is the "best pop song" of 1997.

Retrospective response
Justin Chadwick from Albumism said "Lovefool" is "one of the more exciting straight-ahead pop songs of the contemporary era", declaring it as "pure, exquisitely produced pop perfection." John Bush from AllMusic deemed it a "depressing lament of unrequited affection". Annie Zaleski from The A.V. Club described it as "giddy". Dave Fawbert from ShortList commented, "It’s one of the best things in life when a song comes along, you listen to it, and you just think: “Well, that’s perfect isn’t it?” Every little bit of this three minutes and 14 seconds is absolutely, utterly unimprovable, from the little bllllrrrrring guitar intro, all the way through to that gorgeous ritardando and final chord at the end. Impossibly stylish, groovy and ice cool, this is, you’ll be unsurprised to hear, still brilliant, fully 20 years on. The Swedes, they build things to last – Volvos and ‘Lovefool’, two sides of the same coin." Sal Cinquemani from Slant declared it as a "tongue-in-cheek smash", and noted that "Lovefool" "criminally crowned the band as one-hit wonders in the U.S." Treblezine wrote that "it’s not difficult to understand the effect of this song. It’s got that certain quality that digs right down into your being and glows with a precise sense of rhythm and pleasure."

"Lovefool" ranked 18th in The Village Voices 1996 Pazz & Jop poll and 19th the following year. Slant Magazine listed the song number 40 on its 100 Best Singles of the 1990s list, and Pitchfork ranked it number 66 on its Top 200 Tracks of the 1990s in 2010 and number 64 on its The 250 Best Songs of the 1990s in 2022. Treblezine placed the song at number 50 in their Top 100 Singles of the ’90s in 2007. In 2012, Porcys listed it at number two in their ranking of 100 Singles 1990-1999.

Music video
Three music videos were shot for the song. The first one for Europe—"much more bleak, much more our original style" says Nina Persson. "We had an actor playing a sort of handsome-man-love-interest of mine, and he was supposed to be a kind of gangster and the band played his gang members."

The second one was directed by Geoff Moore in New York. It features a man being lost on an island and putting a message in a bottle into the water. A woman implied to be his lover is shown on a dock reading a newspaper and at the end of the video receives and reads the message and smiles. The video also shows the band performing the song in what looks to be the interior of the bottle released by the man lost at sea, as well as Nina Persson looking out from the bottle's neck and later through a periscope at the woman. Midway through the song, the band is also interviewed by several scuba equipment-wearing reporters who descend from a ladder into the room.

The third and last music video was created to promote Baz Luhrmann's movie Romeo + Juliet. Similar to the second music video, this video replaces some scenes with movie clips featuring Leonardo DiCaprio, Claire Danes and John Leguizamo.

Track listings

Original release
 European CD single, UK 7-inch and cassette single
 "Lovefool" – 3:16
 "Nasty Sunny Beam" – 2:53

 UK, Australasian, and Japanese CD single
 "Lovefool" – 3:16
 "Nasty Sunny Beam" – 2:53
 "Iron Man" (first try) – 3:39

Re-release

 European CD1
 "Lovefool" (radio edit) – 3:16
 "Lovefool" (Tee's's club radio) – 3:21
 "Lovefool" (Tee's Frozen Sun mix) – 7:50
 "Lovefool" (Puck version) – 3:14

 European CD2 and UK cassette single
 "Lovefool" (radio edit) – 3:17
 "Lovefool" (Tee's club radio) – 3:20

 UK CD1
 "Lovefool" (radio edit) – 3:17
 "Lovefool" (Tee's club radio) – 3:21
 "Lovefool" (Tee's Frozen Sun mix) – 7:50

 UK CD2
 "Lovefool" (radio edit) – 3:17
 "Sick & Tired" (live) – 3:34
 "Carnival" (live) – 3:32
 "Rise & Shine" (live) – 4:01

Charts

Weekly charts

Year-end charts

All-time charts

Certifications

Release history

Twocolors version

The German electronic duo Twocolors recorded a cover of the song in 2020. It charted in Germany and many European charts. It topped the charts in Poland and achieved great success in post-Soviet countries, especially in Russia as well. A version of the song featuring American singer Pia Mia was released on 12 November 2020.

Charts

Weekly charts

Year-end charts

Certifications

Other cover versions
 American rock band New Found Glory recorded a cover version for their album From the Screen to Your Stereo Part II.
 American actress and singer Leighton Meester performed a version of the song in June 2015 for The A.V. Club A.V. Undercover series.
 Japanese pop singer Dream Ami has recorded a cover of the song.
 Musical collective Postmodern Jukebox has recorded a cover of this song in the style of Frank Sinatra and big band music.

Samplings

 Justin Bieber interpolated the chorus for his 2009 song "Love Me".
 Claire Rosinkranz interpolated the chorus for her 2021 single "Frankenstein".

References

External links
 "Lovefool" lyrics
 

1996 songs
1996 singles
1997 singles
The Cardigans songs
Bubblegum pop songs
Mercury Records singles
Number-one singles in New Zealand
Number-one singles in Poland
Number-one singles in Russia
Number-one singles in Scotland
Songs written by Nina Persson
Songs written by Peter Svensson
Stockholm Records singles
Virgin Records singles